LVL UP was an American lo-fi band from Purchase, New York, United States.

History
LVL UP formed in 2011 at SUNY Purchase as a recording project between Mike Caridi, Dave Benton, and their friend Ben Smith, with the original intention of releasing a split cassette with Nick Corbo's then-solo material. They instead released their debut album, Space Brothers via Evil Weevil Records, as one band, and Greg Rutkin joined shortly afterwards for the group's first show. Smith left the band for personal reasons just before the release of second album Hoodwink'd, a joint release on Caridi and Benton's label Double Double Whammy and Exploding in Sound.

In 2016, the band's third LP Return to Love was released by Sub Pop. The album received favorable reviews with comparisons being drawn to the works of Dinosaur Jr. and Pavement.

On June 11, 2018, the band announced they were retiring the project after their fall tour. Their last show was September 28 in New York City.

Band members
Mike Caridi - guitar, vocals
Dave Benton - guitar, vocals
Nick Corbo - bass, vocals
Greg Rutkin - drums
 Ben Smith - guitar

Discography
Studio albums
Space Brothers (2011)
Hoodwink'd (2014)
Return to Love (2016)
EPs
Extra Worlds (2013)
Three Songs (2015)
Splits
LVL UP / Porches 7" (2013)
LVL UP / Krill / Ovlov / Radiator Hospital 7" (2014)
LVL UP / Frankie Cosmos 7" (2018)

References

Musical groups from New York (state)
Musical groups established in 2011
Musical groups disestablished in 2018
Lo-fi music groups
Run for Cover Records artists
2011 establishments in New York (state)